Sihtric or Sitric is an anglo-Saxon personal name.  It is cognate with the Old Norse Sigtrygg.

People called Sihtric or Sitric, include:

Sitric Cáech (died 927), ruler of Dublin and then Viking Northumbria in the early 10th century
Sitric II of Northumbria  (fl. c. 942), ruler of Northumbria in the 10th century
Sihtric (Abbot of Tavistock) (died 1082), Anglo-Saxon clergyman
Sitric the Dane, an 11th-century ruler of Waterford
Sitric mac Ualgairg, king of Breifne 1256/7